Salogo is a department or commune of Ganzourgou Province in central-eastern Burkina Faso. Its capital lies at the town of Salogo. According to the 2006 census, the department has a total population of 21,405.

Towns and villages
 Salogo (3,368 inhabitants) 
 Boilghin	(1,101 inhabitants)
 Filiba (1,511 inhabitants)
 Foulgo (843 inhabitants)
 Gnégnéogo	(1,864 inhabitants)
 Koumséogo	(2,589 inhabitants)
 Nonghin	(1,333 inhabitants)
 Sambtenga	(903 inhabitants)
 Sankango	(1,651 inhabitants)
 Tandaga	(753 inhabitants)
 Tansablogo (800 inhabitants)
 Yamegtenga (1,410 inhabitants)
 Zamsé	(1,258 inhabitants)
 Zoétgomdé	(186 inhabitants)
 Zomnogo	(2,111 inhabitants).

References

Departments of Burkina Faso
Ganzourgou Province